The 1942 Oregon State Beavers football team represented Oregon State University in the Pacific Coast Conference (PCC) during the 1942 college football season.  In their 10th season under head coach Lon Stiner, the Beavers compiled a 4–5–1 record (4–4 against PCC opponents), finished in fifth place in the PCC, and outscored their opponents, 157 to 142.  The team played its home games at Bell Field in Corvallis, Oregon.

Schedule

References

Oregon State
Oregon State Beavers football seasons
Oregon State Beavers football